An indirect presidential election (officially the 8th Federal Convention) was held in West Germany on 23 May 1984. Though not term limited, incumbent Karl Carstens elected not to seek a second term. His Christian Democratic Union instead nominated Richard von Weizsäcker, the Governing Mayor of West Berlin. The Greens, who were represented at the Federal Convention for the first time, nominated author Luise Rinser. The SPD and FDP elected not to nominate candidates. Weizsäcker won the election with 80% of the vote on the first ballot.

Composition of the Federal Convention
The President is elected by the Federal Convention consisting of all the members of the Bundestag and an equal number of delegates representing the states. These are divided proportionally by population to each state, and each state's delegation is divided among the political parties represented in its parliament so as to reflect the partisan proportions in the parliament.

Source: Eine Dokumentation aus Anlass der Wahl des Bundespräsidenten am 18. März 2012

Results

References

1984 in West Germany
1984
May 1984 events in Europe
Richard von Weizsäcker
1984 elections in Germany